Oliver Fox (born 14 March 1999) is an English rugby union player for Ealing Trailfinders in the RFU Championship, and previously for Bath in the Premiership Rugby. His main position is scrum-half.

Career
An early convert from rugby league, Fox played the 13-a-side game from the age of five and joined Wakefield-based Sandal RUFC four years later. He switched to the Yorkshire Carnegie Academy when 14. He played for England U18s during their tour in South Africa.

He made his senior debut for Carnegie against Newport Gwent Dragons in the 2016-17 British and Irish Cup back in December 2016. He later made his league debut in the Greene King IPA Championship at Jersey Reds in November 2017.

He was called up to the England U20s squad for the 2019 Six Nations Under 20s Championship and for the 2019 World Rugby Under 20 Championship.

On 14 March 2019, Fox left Yorkshire Carnegie to sign for Premiership side Bath from the 2019–20 season. He made his first-team debut for Bath against Exeter Chiefs in the Premiership Rugby Cup during the 2019–20 season.

References

External links
Bath Rugby Profile
ESPN Scrum Profile
Its Rugby Profile
Ultimate Rugby Profile

1999 births
Living people
Bath Rugby players
English rugby union players
Leeds Tykes players
Rugby union players from Dewsbury
Rugby union scrum-halves